Özman Gıraud (born 1 June 1939) is a Turkish former sports shooter. He competed in the skeet event at the 1972 Summer Olympics.

References

1939 births
Living people
Turkish male sport shooters
Olympic shooters of Turkey
Shooters at the 1972 Summer Olympics
Place of birth missing (living people)
20th-century Turkish people